1993 Kashima Antlers season

Review and events
Kashima Antlers won J.League Suntory series (first stage).

League results summary

League results by round

Competitions

Domestic results

J.League

Suntory series

NICOS series

J.League Championship

Emperor's Cup

J.League Cup

Player statistics

Transfers

In:

Out:

Awards
J.League Best XI: Shunzo Ōno, Santos, Yasuto Honda

References

Other pages
 J. League official site
 Kashima Antlers official site

Kashima Antlers
Kashima Antlers seasons